Charles Browne (September 28, 1875 in Philadelphia – August 17, 1947 in Princeton, New Jersey) was a Democratic Party politician who represented  from 1923–1925.

Biography
Browne was born in Philadelphia on September 28, 1875. He attended private schools in Philadelphia and graduated from Princeton University in 1896. He studied medicine, and graduated from the University of Pennsylvania School of Medicine in 1900, and then attended the University of Berlin in 1902 and 1903. He served as overseer of the poor in Princeton from 1912–1914, and was Mayor of Princeton from 1914 to 1923. Browne served as first lieutenant and captain in the Medical Corps from March 1917 to April 1919 and afterwards resumed the practice of his profession in Princeton.

Browne was elected as a Democrat to the Sixty-eighth Congress, serving in office from March 4, 1923 to March 4, 1925, but was an unsuccessful candidate for reelection in 1924 to the Sixty-ninth Congress.

After leaving Congress, he was a member of the New Jersey Board of Public Utilities from 1925 to 1931. He served in the New Jersey General Assembly from 1937 to 1939, and again in 1941 and 1942. He was an adviser in the department of politics at Princeton University. Browne died in Princeton on August 17, 1947. His remains were cremated and the ashes interred in the grounds of his home in Princeton.

References

External links

Charles Browne at Political Graveyard

Democratic Party members of the United States House of Representatives from New Jersey
Mayors of Princeton, New Jersey
Politicians from Mercer County, New Jersey
Politicians from Philadelphia
Princeton University alumni
1875 births
1947 deaths
United States Army Medical Corps officers
United States Army personnel of World War I
Democratic Party members of the New Jersey General Assembly
Perelman School of Medicine at the University of Pennsylvania alumni
Military personnel from New Jersey